Ryan Provincial Park is a provincial park in British Columbia, Canada.

External links

Provincial parks of British Columbia
Parks in the Regional District of East Kootenay
1959 establishments in British Columbia
Protected areas established in 1959